KV Pharmaceutical Company (KV) was an American drug company that brought generic and non-branded pharmaceutical products to the market. Headquartered in St. Louis, Missouri, it had research and manufacturing facilities, as well as marketing and sales operations, the latter activities conducted through its subsidiaries, Ther-Rx Corporation and Nesher Pharmaceuticals Inc.

Background
KV was founded by Bob Keith & Victor Hermelin in 1942 who ran the company until 1975, when he was replaced by his son Marc. Marc Hermelin was ousted in 2008 when an FDA inspection took place. The following year KV convicted of felony charges for the "making, marketing, and distribution of adulterated and unapproved drugs" was shut down by the Food and Drug Administration (FDA). After a proxy fight, M. Hermelin returned to the company's board. Between 2008 and 2010, KV lost three-quarters of its workforce, down to 350. KV was reapproved for manufacturing drugs in 2010, while its Ethex manufacturing subsidiary was sold.

Rather than developing new molecular entities, KV researches different modes of drug delivery. It developed bioadhesive drug delivery where molecules adhere to wet sites such as a mucosa (example Clindesse), and is investigating quick-dissolving and controlled-release drug venues.

Makena pricing controversy
In February 2011, U.S. Food and Drug Administration (FDA) granted approval to KV for "Makena" (hydroxyprogesterone caproate or OHPC) for the prevention of premature birth in women with a single fetus of less than 37 weeks gestation who had at least one previous preterm birth. For many years, however, OHPC had been available and used by obstetricians "off label". Prior to the release of Makena, the drug was compounded by pharmacies for $15, or less, per injection. Typically 15 to 20 injections are given over a treatment course, costing a total of $225 to $300. With the FDA approval of Makena as an orphan drug, KV received the exclusive right to sell the drug for seven years. KV boosted its price by a factor of 100, to $1,500 per injection, or about $25,000 per treatment.

The pricing policy of KV was heavily criticized as it substantially increased medication cost and removed less expensive alternatives. KV indicated that the cost of taking care of a premature birth is about $51,000 justifying the cost of the medication, further, a system would be in place to enable patients without means to obtain the medication. Thus, expenses would essentially fall on the public sector and insurance carriers. A number of physician organizations have opposed the pricing policy of the company as did the March of Dimes that supported the arrival of Makena. The FDA commissioner Margaret Hamburg stated that the agency was not in a position to influence pricing. Concerned about price gouging, two Senators, Amy Klobuchar (D-Minn.) and Sherrod Brown (D-Ohio) indicated that they plan to initiate hearings with the Federal Trade Commission  about KV's conduct. The controversy spawned protests like the "Shame on You KV Pharmaceutical and CEO Greg Divis" Facebook page.

By the end of March the FDA announced that pharmacies compounding the drug independently will not face legal reprisal, thus enabling the price of the drug to remain in the $10–20 range. After this announcement, K-V's stock dropped by more than 60% on March 30, 2011, and the company cut the price of Makena to $690 per dose.

Bankruptcy and acquisition
KV Pharmaceutical filed a petition for protection under Chapter 11 of the Bankruptcy Act on August 4, 2012 in U.S. Bankruptcy Court for the Southern District of New York in Manhattan.  The petition listed the company’s assets as $237 million and its debts as $728 million. The filing came on the same day that the company failed to make a $95 million payment it owed to Hologic Inc., KV’s partner in developing Makena. The bankruptcy followed a long string of troubles for KV involving oversize morphine tablets, a criminal prosecution, and the barring of KV’s former chairman, Marc Hermelin, from doing business with federal health programs.

The company emerged from bankruptcy in 2013 with less debt and a $375 million recapitalization, including cancellation of its previous preferred and common stock.  Senior secured notes were paid in cash, and general unsecured creditors received a pro rata share of $10.25 million. Convertible subordinated noteholders received 7 percent of KV’s new common shares in addition to shares purchased through the rights offering or direct purchase of shares.

The company changed its name to Lumara Health, Inc. in May, 2014 and in September, 2014 announced that it was being acquired by two different buyers in deals valued at $757 million.  Waltham, Massachusetts-based AMAG Pharmaceuticals acquired Lumara Health for $675 million in cash and stock, and in a separate transaction, Dublin, Ireland-based Perrigo Co. acquired Lumara Health’s women’s health care business, including the Clindesse Vaginal Cream, Gynazole-1 and Evamist products, for $82 million. The AMAG Pharmaceuticals acquisition included the Makena product.  Lumara Health now operates as a division of AMAG Pharmaceuticals.

Products

Ther-Rx Corporation
 Gynazole-1 (butoconazole nitrate vaginal cream, 2%)
 Clindesse (clindamycin phosphate vaginal cream, 2%)
 Evamist (estradiol transdermal spray)
 Makena (Hydroxyprogesterone caproate) (after 3/14/2011)

Nesher Pharmaceuticals
 Potassium Chloride Extended-Release Capsules, USP

References

Pharmaceutical companies disestablished in 2014
Companies formerly listed on the New York Stock Exchange
Companies that filed for Chapter 11 bankruptcy in 2012
Defunct pharmaceutical companies of the United States